Double drop D tuning: DADGBD, also known simply as double drop D, is an alternative guitar tuning: both E strings are tuned down ("dropped") one whole step (2 frets) to D rather than E as in standard tuning (EADGBE).

Uses of double dropped D tuning 

The main use for double dropped D is so that guitarists can play intervals of a fifth with one finger on the bass strings, and play the treble side of a barre chord. Some recordings that make effective use of this tuning are "Black Water" by The Doobie Brothers, "The Loner," "Cortez the Killer," "Don't Let It Bring You Down," "Ohio" and "Cinnamon Girl" by Neil Young, "Choctaw Bingo" and "We Can't Make It Here" by James McMurtry, "Find the Cost of Freedom" by Crosby, Stills, Nash, and Young, "Going to California" by Led Zeppelin, "The End" by The Doors, "Devils & Dust" by Bruce Springsteen, "Satellite" by Elliott Smith, "Overkill" by Men At Work, "Bryter Layter" by Nick Drake and "Nobody's Fault but My Own" by Beck.

Examples of chords in dropped D tuning 

Chords in double dropped D tuning are formed as they are in standard tuning, with the exception of the first and sixth strings, which are either omitted or fretted one whole step higher:

Note that these chords are not the power chords commonly played in double drop D tuning. Power chords generally mute the higher notes rather than the lower notes:

For purposes of making the table easier to read, spaces are provided between each number when the fret number becomes a double digit.

Some examples of the simplified barre chords are shown below. 
Chords involving the minor third may be more difficult to fret.

References

Guitar tunings